Oxenfoord Castle School was a girls' private boarding school, based at Oxenfoord Castle, Pathhead, Midlothian, near Edinburgh in Scotland.

The school was founded in 1931 and closed in 1993. It was founded by Lady Marjorie Dalrymple, sister of John Dalrymple, 11th Earl of Stair.

Alumni
 Celia, Viscountess Whitelaw of Penrith
 Cherry Drummond, 16th Baroness Strange

See also
 Blairmore School, closed in same year as Oxenfoord.
 Cademuir International School
 Rannoch School
 St Margaret's School, Edinburgh

References

Educational institutions established in 1931
Educational institutions disestablished in 1993
Defunct schools in Midlothian
Defunct private schools in Scotland
Defunct boarding schools in Scotland
Charities based in Scotland
Defunct girls' schools in Scotland
1931 establishments in Scotland
1993 disestablishments in Scotland